Mercy Hatton (25 January 1891 – 26 January 1986) was a British actress. She was born in Bromley, Kent, England as  Constance Mercy Bird.

Hatton was married to Wilfred (Russell) Mallinson. She died in 1986 in Bray, County Wicklow, Republic of Ireland.

Selected filmography
 The Harbour Lights (1914)
 The World, the Flesh and the Devil (1914)
 Beau Brocade (1916)
 The Laughing Cavalier (1917)
 The Romance of Old Bill (1918)
 The Sands of Time (1919)
 Her Son (1920)
 The Case of Lady Camber (1920)
 The Romance of a Movie Star (1920)
 A Sportsman's Wife (1921)
 Christie Johnstone (1921)
 A Master of Craft (1922)

References

External links

1891 births
1989 deaths
English film actresses
English silent film actresses
20th-century English actresses
People from Bromley